De-Stalinization was the elimination of the consequences of Stalinism in the Soviet Union and some other states:

De-Stalinization (Czechoslovakia)
De-Stalinization (Poland)
De-Stalinization (Romania)
De-Stalinization (Eastern Bloc)